The Big Sur Folk Festival, held from 1964 to 1971 in California, was an informal gathering of prominent and emerging folk artists from across the United States. Nancy Jane Carlen (1941-2013) was working at the Esalen Institute when Joan Baez was asked to lead workshops on music. Carlen was a good friend of Baez, and they decided to invite other artists, which turned into the first festival.

Baez performed at all seven events. Well-known acts included Joni Mitchell, Judy Collins, the Beach Boys, Crosby, Stills, Nash & Young, Country Joe McDonald, John Sebastian, Kris Kristofferson, Arlo Guthrie, Blood, Sweat & Tears, Taj Mahal, Dorothy Morrison with the Edwin Hawkins Singers, and Julie Payne. All of the artists were paid union scale, about $50. The audience paid $3.50 to $5.50, depending on the year. All proceeds benefitted Baez's Institute for the Study of Nonviolence.

Carlen intended it to be a friendly and low-key event that allowed artists to relax after their long summer concert series. It was held except for one year in front of the pool at the Esalen Institute on the Big Sur coast. The second-to-last year was held at the Monterey County Fairgrounds. Carlen purposefully kept advertising to a minimum to help keep crowds small. Richard and Mimi Fariña performed for the first time at the festival, which led to a recording contract.

At the September 1969 festival, a documentary film was made. Celebration at Big Sur featured many performers who had played only four weeks earlier at Woodstock from August 15–18. The festival was later considered by some as the antithesis of the commercial Woodstock, but it was originally seen by the artists an antidote to the Newport Folk Festival.

Founding 

The festival was founded in 1964 by Nancy Carlen. She was attending Boston University when she met Joan Baez. Baez at the time lived in Carmel Valley. Impressed with Baez' music and social convictions, Nancy drove cross-country and arrived in Big Sur in 1961. She got a job at Esalen and began living there.

Carlen wrote that the festival "started as a lark, Esalen Institute offering us a chance to take over that magnificent place for a whole weekend–the catch–an Esalen style seminar on "The New Folk Music". She invited Baez to lead the workshop. Carlen had met Richard and Mimi Farina at a mutual friend's home. She brainstormed ideas for the festival with Richard and invited both of them. It was their first professional performance.

Carlen invited Malvina Reynolds, Mark Spoelstra, Roger Abraham, and local artists Janet Smith and Richard and Mimi Fariña. Carlen performed as well.  Carlen later said she intended the festival to be a "performers' festival," where the artists could enjoy some peace and solitude together after the long summer on the festival circuit.

The audience liked Mimi and Dickson Farina so much that three record companies offered the duo a recording contract. Since Richard already had a publishing contract with folk giant Vanguard, and since Mimi's sister Joan had done well in her contract with Vanguard, they signed with them.

Later concerts 

The festival was held annually from 1964 through 1969 at the Esalen Institute in Big Sur. In 1970 it moved to the Monterey County Fairgrounds, and returned to Esalen for the last concert in 1971.

As the seminar evolved into full concerts, Carlen kept the events purposefully small, emphasizing "quality and atmosphere over publicity and commercial success". Even when well-known artists like the Beach Boys or Crosby, Stills, Nash & Young were scheduled to perform, Carlen kept attendance to no more than a few thousand. She preferred crowds of less than 6000, preferably 3000. In 1971, she paid for no advertising and issued no tickets, only invitations. She paid performers union scale, never more than $50 per person. The admission charge was $3.50 to $5.50, depending on the year. For security, she used members of Baez' Institute for the Study of Nonviolence.

From 1964 to 1971, the Big Sur Folk Festival featured a line up of emerging and established artists, including Joan Baez, Joni Mitchell, Judy Collins, the Beach Boys, Crosby, Stills, Nash and Young, Country Joe McDonald, John Sebastian, Kris Kristofferson, Arlo Guthrie, Dorothy Morrison with the Edwin Hawkins Singers, Julie Payne, and Mimi Farina. During the October 1970 festival, Kristofferson learned that Janis Joplin, with whom he had been involved, had died of an overdose in Los Angeles.

At Esalen, the audience sat on the grass in front of the swimming pool, and the artists performed on the other side of the pool with the Pacific Ocean in the distance. In 1968 the audience totaled around 5,000 each day. In September, 1970, the crowd at the Monterey County Fairgrounds numbered six or seven thousand.

The Beach Boys' performance at the 1970 festival at the Monterey County Fairgrounds helped establish their place as a rock and roll band, and their importance as a live act. Manager Jack Riley claimed that their appearance at the festival led to the invitation to play Carnegie Hall soon afterward. A recording of "Wouldn't It Be Nice" was included on a Live at Big Sur Folk Festival single and album.

Although the event is sometimes now regarded as the antithesis of the grossly-commercial Woodstock, it was originally seen as antidote to the Newport Folk Festival. The folk festival in part inspired the first Monterey Pop Festival in 1967.

Documentary film 

A documentary film, Celebration at Big Sur, was made about the September 13 and 14, 1969 Big Sur festival, which featured many performers who had played at Woodstock a few weeks earlier from August 15–18. The Los Angeles Herald Examiner reported that the performers donated their time for the concert and film in exchange for a portion of the net profits. The Daily Variety reported in April 1970 that the film's profits were divided between the Big Sur Folk Festival Foundation (88%) and the crew (12%). Another source reported that Baez' Institute for the Study of Nonviolence benefited from the film's profits.

About 10–15,000 people camped out for three miles up and down Highway One for the two-day festival. The event audience was so well-mannered that those without the $4.00 admission price listened from the highway, even though there was no gate.

Performance dates and artists 

The following artists performed from 1965 to 1971:

First Big Sur Folk Festival
Sunday, June 21, 1964

 Joan Baez
 Roger Abraham
 Nancy Carlen
 Malvina Reynolds
 Mark Spoelstra
 Janet Smith
 Mimi & Richard Fariña

Second Big Sur Folk Festival
September 13–14, 1965

 Joan Baez
 The Incredible String Band
 John Sebastian
 Delanie and Bonnie
 Dorothy Morrison and the Comb Sisters

Third Big Sur Folk Festival
Sunday, July 10, 1966

 Joan Baez
 Judy Collins
 Mark Spoelstra
 Malvina Reynolds
 Nancy Carlen
 Al Kooper
 Mimi Fariña

Fourth Big Sur Folk Festival
June 28–29, 1967

 Joan Baez
 Judy Collins
 Mark Spoelstra
 Jade the Mad Muse (?)
 Chambers Brothers
 Mimi Fariña
 Al Kooper

Fifth Big Sur Folk Festival
September 8–9, 1968

 Joan Baez
 Judy Collins
 Mimi Fariña
 Arlo Guthrie
 Charles River Valley Boys

Sixth Big Sur Folk Festival
September 13–14, 1969

 Joan Baez
 Joni Mitchell
 Crosby, Stills, Nash & Young
 John Sebastian
 Johanna Demetrakas
 Dorothy Morrison & the Edwin Hawkins Singers
 Mimi Fariña
 Julie Payne
 Ruthann Friedman
 Carol Ann Cisneros
 The Comb Sisters
 Chris Ethridge
 Flying Burrito Brothers
 Struggle Mountain Resistance Band

Seventh Big Sur Folk Festival
Saturday, October 3, 1970
Held at Monterey County Fairgrounds

1:00 pm concert:
 Beach Boys 
 John Phillips
 Joan Baez
 Merry Clayton and Love Ltd.
 Kris Kristofferson
 John Hartford

8:00 pm concert: 
 Beach Boys
 John Phillips
 Linda Ronstadt, with Swamp Water
 Mimi Fariña & Tom Jans
 Mark Spoelstra
 Country Joe McDonald
 Tom Ghent
 Joan Baez
Finale: All sing You Ain't Going Nowhere

Eighth (and final) Big Sur Folk Festival
Saturday, September 25, 1971

 Joan Baez
 Kris Kristofferson
 Mimi Fariña and Tom Jans
 Mickey Newbury
 Big Sur Choir
 Lily Tomlin & Larry Hankin
 Blood, Sweat and Tears

Merchandise 

Posters produced by Bob Muson and other artists are now collectable. Few were made as the festival was not widely advertised and very few posters remain in existence. A poster for the third Big Sur Folk Festival in 1966 sold in 2014 for $700.

Recordings and media 

 "California Saga: California", a single by the Beach Boys on their 1973 album Holland.
 "Wouldn't It Be Nice" by the Beach Boys, released on Celebration and as a single in 1971.
 Celebration at Big Sur, film, 1971. From the 1969 festival.
 Celebration, album, 1970. From the 1970 festival. (CD released only in Europe)
 One Hand Clapping, album, 1971. From the 1971 festival. (Not available on CD)  Columbia, 1972, New York, N.Y.
 Live at the Big Sur Folk Festival, Kris Kristofferson 2016, 37min

References

External links 

 Clips from Celebration at Big Sur (video). Neil Young. Crosby Stills Nash & Young; with Dallas Taylor on drums and Gregg Reeves on bass. Sixth Big Sur Folk Festival, 1969

1965 festivals
1965 in American music
1965 in California
1965 in music
1965 music festivals
Big Sur
California culture
Concerts in the United States
Counterculture festivals
Folk festivals in the United States
Hippie movement
Events in California
Music festivals established in 1965
Timeline of 1960s counterculture